Daniel Dickinson Stevens (December 19, 1839  – November 7, 1916) was a United States Navy sailor during the American Civil War who received the Medal of Honor, America's highest military decoration, for his actions at the Second Battle of Fort Fisher.

Biography
In mid-January 1865, Stevens was serving as a quartermaster on the  when the ship took part in the bombardment of Fort Fisher, North Carolina. For his conduct during this action, he was awarded the Medal of Honor.

Before leaving the Navy, Stevens reached the rank of Chief Quartermaster. 

He was an early member of the Naval Order of the United States and was assigned insignia number 58.

He died at age 76 and was buried in Walnut Grove Cemetery, Danvers, Massachusetts.

Medal of Honor citation

Rank and Organization:
Quartermaster, U.S. Navy. Born: 1840, Sagnange, Tenn. Accredited to: Massachusetts. Letter July 15, 1870, Secretary of the Navy to Hon. S. Hooper.

Citation:
On board the U.S.S. Canonicus during attacks on Fort Fisher, on January 13, 1865. As the Canonicus moved into position at 700 yards from shore, the enemy troops soon obtained her range and opened with heavy artillery fire, subjecting her to several hits and near misses until late in the afternoon when the heavier ships coming into line drove them into their bombproofs. Twice during the battle, in which his ship sustained 36 hits, the flag was shot away and gallantly replaced by Stevens.

See also

List of American Civil War Medal of Honor recipients: Q–S

Notes

References

1839 births
1916 deaths
United States Navy Medal of Honor recipients
Union Navy sailors
People from La Grange, Tennessee
American Civil War recipients of the Medal of Honor